Quararibea dolichosiphon is a species of flowering plant in the Bombacaceae family. It is found only in Panama.

References

dolichosiphon
Endemic flora of Panama
Taxonomy articles created by Polbot